Last Frontier: The Vesuvius Incident is a 1993 board game published by Fat Messiah Games.

Contents
Last Frontier: The Vesuvius Incident is a game in which the player commands twelve UN Colonial Marines in a rescue mission to save the surviving lab ship crew before their damaged ship is destroyed.

Reviews
Dragon #209
White Wolf Inphobia #54 (April, 1995)

References

Board games introduced in 1993